Polina Alekseyevna Khorosheva (born 19 March 1992) is a Russian sport shooter.

She participated at the 2018 ISSF World Shooting Championships, winning a medal.

References

External links

Living people
1992 births
Russian female sport shooters
ISSF rifle shooters
Universiade gold medalists for Russia
Universiade silver medalists for Russia
Universiade medalists in shooting
Shooters at the 2015 European Games
Shooters at the 2019 European Games
European Games bronze medalists for Russia
European Games medalists in shooting
Medalists at the 2013 Summer Universiade
21st-century Russian women